The kwanza (sign: Kz;) is the currency of Angola. Four different currencies using the name kwanza have circulated since 1977.

The currency derives its name from the Kwanza River (Cuanza, Coanza, Quanza).

Overview

First kwanza, AOK, 1977-1990

Kwanza was introduced following Angolan independence. It replaced the escudo at par and was subdivided into 100 lwei. Its ISO 4217 code was AOK.

Coins

The first coins issued for the kwanza currency did not bear any date of issue, although all bore the date of independence, "11 de Novembro de 1975". They were in denominations of 50 lwei, 1, 2, 5 and 10 kwanzas. 20 kwanza coins were added in 1978. The last date to appear on these coins was 1979.

Banknotes
On 8 January 1977, banknotes dated 11 DE NOVEMBRO DE 1975 were introduced by the Banco Nacional de Angola (National Bank of Angola) in denominations of 20, 50, 100, 500, and 1000 kwanzas. The 20 kwanza note was replaced by a coin in 1978.

Novo kwanza, AON, 1990–1995
In 1990, the novo kwanza was introduced, with the ISO 4217 code AON. Although it replaced the kwanza at par, Angolans could only exchange 5% of all old notes for new ones; they had to exchange the rest for government securities. This kwanza suffered from high inflation.

Coins

Banknotes
This currency was only issued in note form. The first banknotes issued in 1990 were overprints on earlier notes in denominations of 50 (report not confirmed), 500, 1000 and 5000 novos kwanzas (5000 novos kwanzas overprinted on 100 kwanzas). In 1991, the word novo was dropped from the issue of regular banknotes for 100, 500, 1000, 5000, 10,000, 50,000, 100,000 and 500,000 kwanzas.

Kwanza reajustado, AOR, 1995–1999
In 1995, the kwanza reajustado (plural kwanzas reajustados) replaced the previous kwanza at a rate of 1,000 to 1. It had the ISO 4217 code AOR. The inflation continued and no coins were issued.

Banknotes
Despite the exchange rate, such was the low value of the old kwanza that the smallest denomination of banknote issued was 1000 kwanzas reajustados. Other notes were 5,000, 10,000, 50,000, 100,000, 500,000, 1,000,000 and 5,000,000 kwanzas.

Second kwanza, AOA, 1999–
In 1999, a second currency was introduced simply called the kwanza. It replaced the kwanza reajustado at a rate of 1,000,000 to 1. Unlike the first kwanza, this currency is subdivided into 100 cêntimos. The introduction of this currency saw the reintroduction of coins. Although it suffered early on from high inflation, its value has now stabilized.

Coins

First series

Coins in 10 and 50 cêntimo denominations are no longer used, as the values are minuscule.

Second series

During 2012–14, new coins were introduced in denominations of 50 cêntimos, 1, 5, 10 and 20 kwanzas.

Banknotes

First Series

The banknotes are quite similar in design, with only different colours separating them.

Second series

The Banco Nacional de Angola issued a new series of kwanza banknotes on March 22, 2013, in denominations of 50, 100, 200 and 500 kwanzas. The other denominations (1000, 2000 and 5000 kwanzas) were issued on May 31, 2013. In 2017, the Banco Nacional de Angola issued 5 and 10 kwanzas banknotes as part of the family of banknotes first introduced in 2012.

Third series

In 2020, the Banco National de Angola introduced a new family of kwanza banknotes in denominations of 200, 500, 1,000, 2,000, 5,000 and 10,000 kwanzas. The new banknotes have a portrait of the first president of Angola, António Agostinho Neto. Banknotes of 200 to 2,000 kwanzas are printed on polymer substrate, while the 5,000 and 10,000 kwanzas banknotes are printed on cotton paper, with a 10,000-kwanza note to only be issued if necessary.

Historical exchange rates
This table shows the historical value of one U.S. dollar in Angola kwanzas:

On several occasions during the 1990s, Angola's currency was the least valued currency unit in the world.

Production
The Angolan kwanza banknotes have been produced by De La Rue in England.

See also
 Economy of Angola

References

External links
 Coin Types from Angola Lists, pictures, and values of Angola coin types
 Collection of coin - Angola

Kwanza
Currencies introduced in 1977